Robert "Bob" McPherson (born 22 November 1968) is a British wheelchair curler from Scotland.

McPherson made his paralympic debut at the 2014 Winter Paralympics in Sochi, Russia. He won a bronze medal, with the British team beating China 7–3 in the third-place play-off match.

McPherson also competed on the British Paralympic curling team for the 2018 Paralympics, where they missed the playoffs, finishing 7th with a record of 5–6.

References

External links

 

1968 births
Living people
Scottish male curlers
Scottish wheelchair curlers
Paralympic wheelchair curlers of Great Britain
Paralympic medalists in wheelchair curling
Paralympic bronze medalists for Great Britain
Wheelchair curlers at the 2014 Winter Paralympics
Wheelchair curlers at the 2018 Winter Paralympics
Medalists at the 2014 Winter Paralympics
Sportspeople from Motherwell